Skylarks is a 1936 British comedy film directed by Thornton Freeland and starring Jimmy Nervo, Teddy Knox and Nancy Burne. Nervo and Knox were a comic team, who became associated with the larger Crazy Gang grouping with whom they subsequently appeared in several films. It is a partially lost film, with only a short soundless fragment surviving. The team's earlier film It's in the Bag, their 1936 sound debut, does still survive.

Partial cast
 Jimmy Nervo - Jimmy Doakes
 Teddy Knox - Teddy Cook
 Nancy Burne - Marion Hicks
 Queenie Leonard - Maggie Hicks
 Eddie Gray
 Mervyn Blake
 Amy Veness

References

Bibliography
 Low, Rachael. The History of British Film. Volume VII. Routledge, 1997.

External links

1936 films
1936 comedy films
Films directed by Thornton Freeland
British comedy films
Films set in England
Lost British films
British black-and-white films
Films scored by Percival Mackey
1930s English-language films
1930s British films